Malard (also Romanized as Malārd and Melārd; also known as Malār) is a city in the Central District of Malard County, Tehran province, Iran, and serves as capital of the county. At the 2006 census, its population was 228,673 in 61,302 households. The following census in 2011 counted 290,817 people in 85,445 households. The latest census in 2016 showed a population of 281,027 people in 86,830 households.

Climate
Köppen-Geiger climate classification system classifies its climate as cold semi-arid (BSk).

Transportation

The city is served by buses from the municipal-run Malard and Suburbs Bus Organization, connecting the city to Shahriar, Karaj, Qods, and Tehran.

References 

Malard County

Cities in Tehran Province

Populated places in Tehran Province

Populated places in Malard County